is a former Japanese rugby union player who played as a prop. He spent his whole career playing for Munakata Sanix Blues in Japan's domestic Top League, playing over 70 times. He was named as a backup player for Japan for the 2007 Rugby World Cup. He did though make one appearance for Japan.

References

External links
itsrugby.co.uk profile

1983 births
Living people
People from Aichi Prefecture
Japanese rugby union players
Rugby union props
Munakata Sanix Blues players
Aichi Institute of Technology alumni